Ryan Christopher Hunter-Reay (born December 17, 1980) is a professional American racing driver best known as a winner of both the Indianapolis 500 (2014) and the IndyCar Series championship in 2012. In each accomplishment, Hunter-Reay became the first American to win since Sam Hornish Jr. in 2006. Hunter-Reay also won in the defunct Champ Car World Series twice and the Toyota Grand Prix of Long Beach. In addition to his experience in Indy car racing, Hunter-Reay has competed in the Race of Champions, A1 Grand Prix, and various forms of sports car racing (the American Le Mans Series, the Rolex Grand-Am Sports Car Series and the IMSA Tudor United SportsCar Championship).

Hunter-Reay last drove for Andretti Autosport in the IndyCar Series. When Hunter-Reay initially joined Andretti for 2010, he was only signed to drive for a partial season. Additional sponsorship was found and Hunter-Reay drove the entire season for Andretti. Hunter-Reay has since won both the Indianapolis 500 and the Verizon IndyCar Series championship.

Hunter-Reay most recently drove the number 28 car in the NTT IndyCar Series. The number is a show of support for the estimated 28 million people living with cancer worldwide. Hunter-Reay, who lost his mother to colon cancer in 2009, acts a spokesman on behalf of Racing for Cancer, an advocacy organization.

Career history

Early career
After winning six national karting championships in the World Karting Association, Hunter-Reay won a Skip Barber Karting Scholarship to race in Skip Barber Formula Dodge Series in 1999. Hunter-Reay won the series championship. Hunter-Reay then won a shootout against Formula Dodge drivers for the Skip Barber Big Scholarship and its $250,000 prize. Hunter-Reay would use the scholarship money to compete in the Barber Dodge Pro Series in 2000.

Barber Dodge Pro Series
Hunter-Reay began to compete in the Barber Dodge Pro Series in 1998. Hunter-Reay would drive the #28 Reynard 98E-Dodge V6 with no sponsorship. Hunter-Reay first competed in the race at Mid-Ohio Sports Car Course. In the race Hunter-Reay started and finished in 23rd place after being involved in crash with John McCraig on lap 22. Hunter-Reay returned to the series later in the season at the race at Metro-Dade Homestead Motorsports Complex. Hunter-Reay started in 21st place and finished in 22nd place after retiring due to damage to his car after 4 laps. Hunter-Reay scored no points towards the championship and finished 40th in the final point standings.

Hunter-Reay returned to the series in 2000 to drive the #31 Reynard 98E-Dodge V6 with no sponsorship. At the season-opening race at Sebring International Raceway Hunter-Reay started in 9th place and finished in 8th place. Hunter-Reay would qualify on the pole position at the race at Concord Pacific Place and would finish in 8th place in the race. Hunter-Reay's best finish during the season was a 4th-place finish at the race at Lime Rock Park. Hunter-Reay would finish 5th in the final point standings with 104 points. Hunter-Reay would also win the series rookie of the year award and would receive sponsorship from the series for the following season as a result.

Hunter-Reay returned to the series in 2001 to drive the #31 Barber Dodge Pro Series Rookie of the Year/Simpson Performance Products Reynard 98E-Dodge V6. Hunter-Reay would win his first race in the series at the third race of the season, at Lime Rock Park. In the race Hunter-Reay started in 2nd place and led for 21 of 30 laps and would set the fastest lap of the race. Hunter-Reay would win his second, and final, race in the series at Exhibition Place. In the race Hunter-Reay only led the final six laps of the race after passing Matt Plumb, who had qualified on the pole position, had the fastest lap of the race and every lap in the race up to that point. Hunter-Reay would also have a pair of 2nd-place finishes at the races at Sebring International Raceway and Lime Rock Park. Hunter-Reay would finish 5th in the final point standings with 114 points.

Atlantic Championship
Hunter-Reay began to compete in the Toyota Atlantic Championship, at the time the main development series for the FedEx CART Championship Series, in 2002. Hunter-Reay would drive the #1 Medlock Ames Winery/U.S. Print Swift 014.a-Toyota 4A-GE for Hylton Motorsports. Hunter-Reay would make his debut at Fundidora Park. Hunter-Reay would start in 6th place and retire to finish in 23rd place. At the second race of the season, on the Streets of Long Beach Hunter-Reay started in 2nd place and finished in 18th place after having the fastest lap of the race. At the third race of the season, at the Milwaukee Mile, Hunter-Reay qualified on the pole position, had the fastest lap of the race and led the most laps of the race. Hunter-Reay would retire from the race to finish in 19th place. At the fourth race of the season, at Laguna Seca Raceway, Hunter-Reay qualified on the pole position, had the fastest lap of the race and led the most laps to get his first win in the series. Hunter-Reay would then finish in 4th place at the following race of the season, at Portland International Raceway. At the sixth race of the season, at Chicago Motor Speedway, Hunter-Reay started in 6th place and led the most laps and had the fastest lap of the race to win his second race of the season. At the seventh race of the season, at Exhibition Place, Hunter-Reay started in 7th place and finished in 4th place. Hunter-Reay would then get his third, and final, win of both the season and his Atlantics career at the eighth race of the season, at Burke Lakefront Airport, after leading the most laps. Hunter-Reay would then start 15th and finish 7th at the following race, at Circuit Trois-Rivières. At the tenth race of the season, at Road America, Hunter-Reay started 8th and retired from the race to finish in 24th place. Hunter-Reay then started 6th and finished 22nd at the following race, at Circuit Gilles Villeneuve. At the following race of the season, the season-ending race at the Pepsi Center, Hunter-Reay retired from the race and finished in an unknown position. Hunter-Reay finished out the season ranked in 6th place in the final point standings with 102 points.

Indy car racing

Champ Car World Series
Hunter-Reay began to compete in the Champ Car World Series in 2003 to drive the #31 American Spirit Team Johansson Reynard 02i-Ford Cosworth XFE for American Spirit Team Johansson, a team owned by former Formula One and Champ Car World Series driver Stefan Johansson. The previous year Reynard Motorsports filed for bankruptcy and the Champ Car program became owned by Walker Racing. The chassis struggled to compete with the Lola B02/00. The team also competed for the majority of the season without sponsorship. The only race that the team ran with sponsorship was the Gran Premio Telmex-Gigante at Autódromo Hermanos Rodríguez where the car ran with sponsorship from Gonher de Mexico. In the first twelve races of the season Hunter-Reay's best start was a seventh at the G.I. Joe's 200 at Portland International Raceway and a best finish of sixth at the Molson Indy Vancouver at Concord Pacific Place. During this time Hunter-Reay was ranked 14th in points. At the thirteenth race of the season, the Champ Car Grand Prix of Mid-Ohio at Mid-Ohio Sports Car Course Hunter-Reay qualified in 2nd place and finished in 3rd place. Five races later at the season-ending Lexmark Indy 300 at the Surfers Paradise Street Circuit Hunter-Reay started from twelfth place and would make his first of three mandatory pit stops to get slick tires as the track was changing from wet to dry in various parts of the track. Hunter-Reay would soon lead for 15 laps and would keep his car on the track while several other cars were crashing and/or spinning off of the track. Hunter-Reay would go on to win his first Champ Car race.

Hunter-Reay began to drive for Herdez Competition in 2004 in the #4 Herdez Lola B02/00-Ford Cosworth XFE. In the third race of the season, the Time Warner Cable Road Runner 250 at the Milwaukee Mile, Hunter-Reay would qualify on the pole position and lead for all 250 laps to get his second and final Champ Car win. Following the race Hunter-Reay was ranked third in points. Hunter-Reay's best finish in the remaining races was a 4th at the Grand Prix of Road America at Road America. In the race Hunter-Reay started second and made contact with former teammate Jimmy Vasser on the first lap and dropped the two to the rear of the field. Hunter-Reay charged up through the field to get fourth place while Vasser finished eighth. Hunter-Reay would finish ninth in points (the only time Hunter-Reay finished in the top 10 in points in Champ Car) with 199 points.

In 2005 Hunter-Reay began to drive for Rocketsports Racing in the #31 Lola B02/00-Ford Cosworth XFE. The car did not have consistent sponsorship and had to have sponsorship for various races from autobytel.com, Briggs & Stratton, Cytomax and Red Paw Systems. At the Grand Prix of Denver at the Pepsi Center the car ran without sponsorship. Hunter-Reay's best finish during the season was a pair of 6th-place finishes at the Molson Indy Toronto at Exhibition Place and at Denver. Following the Hurricane Relief 400 at Las Vegas Motor Speedway, where Hunter-Reay started 16th and finished 10th, Hunter-Reay was replaced by Michael McDowell for the final two races of the season. Hunter-Reay was 14th in points following the Las Vegas event and would drop to 15th in points after the last two races of the season with 110 points.

IndyCar Series

2007–2010
Hunter-Reay began to drive for Rahal Letterman Racing in the No. 17 Honda for the final six races of the season as a replacement for the released Jeff Simmons. Hunter-Reay made his series debut at the Honda 200 at Mid-Ohio Sports Car Course. In his debut Hunter-Reay started 10th and finished 7th. At the following race, the Firestone Indy 400 at Michigan International Speedway, Hunter-Reay started 12th in the race and had to make a pit stop to replace his damaged helmet. He would finish in 6th place and would be the last car on the lead lap. Hunter-Reay's best start of the season was a 5th at the Detroit Indy Grand Prix at Belle Isle State Park, where he finished 18th (last) due to clutch problems after 24 laps. Hunter-Reay would finish 7th after starting 12th at the season-ending Peak Antifreeze Indy 300 at Chicagoland Speedway. Despite only competing in six races, Hunter-Reay was able to finish 19th in points with 119 points and would win the series rookie of the year award, setting the record for fewest starts in a season by a driver who won the award.

Hunter-Reay returned with Rahal Letterman Racing in 2008. At the season-opening Gainsco Auto Insurance Indy 300 at Homestead-Miami Speedway Hunter-Reay started 9th and finished 7th. Hunter-Reay would then get another 7th at the Indy Japan 300 at Twin Ring Motegi after starting 10th. At the Indianapolis 500 Hunter-Reay qualified in 20th place on the third qualifying day after crashing in turn 3 on Pole Day. However, he managed to finish the race without incident, finishing in 6th place and winning the race's rookie of the year award. During the next four races Hunter-Reay's best finish was an 8th at the Iowa Corn Indy 250 at Iowa Speedway.

At the Camping World Indy Grand Prix at the Glen at Watkins Glen International Hunter-Reay started in 3rd place and was running in 4th place late in the race between Ryan Briscoe, Scott Dixon and Darren Manning. Briscoe and Dixon then made contact and dropped down the running order as a result. Manning took the lead only for Hunter-Reay to take it away on a lap 52 restart. Hunter-Reay would win his first IndyCar Series race and Rahal Letterman would win their first race in four years.

Hunter-Reay's best finish in the remaining races of 2008 was a 6th at the Detroit Indy Grand Prix at Belle Isle State Park. Hunter-Reay finished out the season ranked 8th in points with 360 points. Following the end of the season there was a non-points race, the Nikon Indy 300 on the Surfers Paradise Street Circuit. In the race Hunter-Reay started 5th and finished 3rd.

At the end of the year American Ethanol withdrew their sponsorship due to financial problems and left Hunter-Reay without a team. Prior to the season Hunter-Reay tested a car for HVM Racing. Hunter-Reay was eventually offered a position at Vision Racing to drive the #21 Vision Racing Dallara IR07-Ilmor-Indy V8 HI7R. The team had no sponsorship to start off the season, despite this Hunter-Reay managed to start 14th and finish 2nd at the season-opening Honda Grand Prix of St. Petersburg on the Streets of St. Petersburg. In the process Hunter-Reay gave Vision their best finish in an IndyCar Series race. Hunter-Reay's next best finish for the team came at the next race of the season, the Toyota Grand Prix of Long Beach on the Streets of Long Beach where Hunter-Reay started 12th and finished 11th. At the Indianapolis 500 the team found sponsorship from Izod and William Rast. Hunter-Reay struggled to qualify for the race and on Bump Day at 5:52 p.m. Hunter-Reay was bumped from the field by John Andretti. Hunter-Reay was able to requalify, bumping Alex Tagliani by 0.0324 seconds. Hunter-Reay started 32nd after Tagliani replaced teammate Bruno Junqueira in his qualified car. In the race Hunter-Reay spun in turn 4 on lap 20 and crashed, resulting in a 32nd-place finish. Following the Bombardier Learjet 550 at Texas Motor Speedway Hunter-Reay and Vision parted ways. Hunter-Reay was then announced as the replacement for Vítor Meira, who was injured while racing at Indianapolis, in the #14 ABC Supply Company Dallara IR07-Ilmor-Indy V8 HI7R for A. J. Foyt Enterprises. In his debut for the team at the Iowa Corn Indy 250 at Iowa Speedway Hunter-Reay only completed 2 laps due to a crash. Hunter-Reay would only get two top 10s for Foyt with a 7th at the Honda Indy Toronto at Exhibition Place and a 4th at the Honda Indy 200 at Mid-Ohio Sports Car Course. Hunter-Reay's only top 10 start of the season for either Vision or Foyt was a 7th at Mid-Ohio. Hunter-Reay would finish 15th in points with 298 points. Hunter-Reay was 10th in points following his split from Vision.

In 2010 Hunter-Reay began to drive for Andretti Autosport in a part-time schedule that would consist of all races through the Indianapolis 500. Hunter-Reay would drive the #37 Izod Dallara IR07-Ilmor-Indy V8 HI7R. At the season-opening São Paulo Indy 300 on the Streets of São Paulo Hunter-Reay started 4th and would lead for 20 laps, only to be passed by Will Power on lap 58 of 61. Three races later at the Toyota Grand Prix of Long Beach on the Streets of Long Beach Hunter-Reay started 2nd, set the fastest race lap and led for 64 of 85 laps to win the race. Following the race Hunter-Reay was ranked 3rd in points. At the next race, the RoadRunner Turbo Indy 300 at Kansas Speedway Hunter-Reay started 22nd and finished 5th. At the Indianapolis 500 Hunter-Reay qualified in a disappointing 17th place. In the race Hunter-Reay was on his way to a top 10 finish when on lap 199 in turn 3 he ran out of fuel causing Mike Conway to drive over the left side of Hunter-Reay's car and flip into the catchfence. At the same time Hunter-Reay lost control and drove into the wall. Hunter-Reay would finish in 18th place. Following the race Hunter-Reay was 5th in points and was given additional races. The team would race with additional sponsorship from Ethanol at select races. Prior to the Camping World Grand Prix at The Glen at Watkins Glen International Hunter-Reay was announced as a driver for all the remaining races. Hunter-Reay's best finish following Indianapolis was a 3rd at the Honda Indy Toronto at Exhibition Place. Hunter-Reay would finish 7th in the final point standings with 445 points.

2011–2014

In 2011 Hunter-Reay returned with Andretti Autosport to drive the #28 DHL/Sun Drop Dallara IR07-Ilmor-Indy V8 HI7R. At the first two races of the season, the Honda Grand Prix of St. Petersburg on the Streets of St. Petersburg and the Honda Indy Grand Prix of Alabama at Barber Motorsports Park. In these races Hunter-Reay finished 21st (retired due to handling) and 14th in the races. At the third race of the season, the 2011 Toyota Grand Prix of Long Beach on the Streets of Long Beach Hunter-Reay started 2nd and led for 2 laps. Hunter-Reay was on his way to a respectable finish when he suffered gearbox problems. Hunter-Reay's teammate Mike Conway would win the race while Hunter-Reay finished 23rd. At the following race, the São Paulo Indy 300 on the Streets of São Paulo Hunter-Reay started in 2nd place. At the start of the race Hunter-Reay's steering failed and as a result Hunter-Reay drove straight into a sign along the track. The team made repairs to the car while the race was stopped for rain. Hunter-Reay would finish 18th, five laps down, due to the repairs and the crash. At the Indianapolis 500 the Andretti team struggled in practice. On Bump Day Hunter-Reay was bumped from the field by teammate Marco Andretti with 55 seconds left in qualifying. Andretti later made a deal with A. J. Foyt Enterprises for Hunter-Reay to replace Bruno Junqueira in his already-qualified car. Hunter-Reay would drive the #41 ABC Supply Company/DHL/Sun Drop Dallara IR07-Ilmor-Indy V8 HI7R. In the race Hunter-Reay started 33rd and finished 23rd, three laps down. Following Indianapolis Hunter-Reay would gain additional sponsorships at various races from Snapple (both Texas races), GoDaddy.com (Milwaukee, without DHL or Sun Drop) and Circle K (all other races following Indianapolis). Hunter-Reay would get his first top 10 of the season at the Firestone Twin 275s Race #2 at Texas Motor Speedway with a 9th-place finish after starting 5th in a race that had its starting lineup determined by a random draw. At the following race, the Milwaukee 225 at the Milwaukee Mile Hunter-Reay started 7th and crashed on the first lap, finishing in 26th (last) place. Hunter-Reay then started and finished 8th at the following race, the Iowa Corn Indy 250 at Iowa Speedway. At the following race of the season, the Honda Indy Toronto at Exhibition Place Hunter-Reay started 8th and finished 3rd to get his first podium of the year. Hunter-Reay would then start and finish 7th at the next race, the Edmonton Indy at Edmonton City Centre Airport. Hunter-Reay then got another podium at the following race, the Honda Indy 200 at Mid-Ohio Sports Car Course with a 3rd after starting 5th. At the following race, the MoveThatBlock.com Indy 225 at New Hampshire Motor Speedway Hunter-Reay started 5th and led for 71 laps. Hunter-Reay inherited the lead when several other drivers who had led the race, such as Dario Franchitti and Takuma Sato, were involved in crashes. Rain came in the late stages of the race. On lap 220 of 225 Hunter-Reay was leading Oriol Servià when the race was restarted and almost immediately teammate Danica Patrick spun due to the rain and collected several cars making the race go back to a caution. During this time Servià took the lead. INDYCAR officials decided to revert the results to lap 215 when the race was under caution for the rain. Hunter-Reay's best finish following the New Hampshire race was a 5th at the Kentucky Indy 300 at Kentucky Speedway. At the season-ending 2011 Izod IndyCar World Championship at Las Vegas Motor Speedway Hunter-Reay and Alex Tagliani made light contact while racing each other early in the race. The race was cancelled after Dan Wheldon was fatally injured in an accident on the 11th lap.  Hunter-Reay would finish 7th in points for the season with 347 points.

In 2012 Hunter-Reay returned to drive for Andretti Autosport in the #28 DHL/Sun Drop Dallara DW12-Ilmor-Chevrolet Indy V6 (the DW12 was named after Dan Wheldon, who had tested the car at both Mid-Ohio Sports Car Course and the Indianapolis Motor Speedway when it was called the Dallara IR12), with additional sponsorship from Circle K, Casey's General Stores, Dr. Pepper and Pelotonia. At the season-opening Honda Grand Prix of St. Petersburg on the Streets of St. Petersburg Hunter-Reay started and finished 3rd. Hunter-Reay then finished 2nd three races later at the São Paulo Indy 300 on the Streets of São Paulo. At the Indianapolis 500 Hunter-Reay qualified in a career-best (as of 2014 Indianapolis 500) third place. In the race Hunter-Reay ran consistently in the top 10 until he had to retire after 123 laps due to a suspension problem. Hunter-Reay then started 6th and finished 7th at the Detroit Belle Isle Grand Prix at Belle Isle State Park and started 13th and finished 21st due fuel injector problems at the Firestone 550 at Texas Motor Speedway. Hunter-Reay then won three consecutive races with the Milwaukee IndyFest at the Milwaukee Mile (a race that was, and still is, promoted by Hunter-Reay's team owner Michael Andretti), the Iowa Corn Indy 250 at Iowa Speedway and the Honda Indy Toronto at Exhibition Place. Following the Toronto race Hunter-Reay took the points lead. Hunter-Reay lost the points lead following the Honda Indy 200 at Mid-Ohio at Mid-Ohio Sports Car Course, where he started 7th and finished 24th out of 25 cars due to an engine problem after 79 of 85 laps. At the following race, the GoPro Indy Grand Prix of Sonoma at Sonoma Raceway, Hunter-Reay started 7th and was running in the top 10 late in the race when on a restart Alex Tagliani made contact with Hunter-Reay, causing Hunter-Reay to spin. Hunter-Reay would finish 18th, one lap down, while his main championship rival Will Power finished 2nd. At the following race Hunter-Reay took the championship battle to the final race of the season after he won the Grand Prix of Baltimore on the Streets of Baltimore. At the season-ending MAVTV 500 IndyCar World Championships at Auto Club Speedway Hunter-Reay and Power both had to receive 10-grid spot penalties due to both of them exceeding their five-engine change limit. Hunter-Reay was also battling Tony Kanaan for the A. J. Foyt Oval Championship. In the race, Hunter-Reay and Power were both running mid-pack early in the race. On lap 56, Power spun in turn 2 when he was slightly ahead of Hunter-Reay. Hunter-Reay would avoid Power. With Power in 25th place, Hunter-Ready needed to finish 6th or better to win the championship. Team Penske later managed to repair Power's car (a rarity for open-wheel race cars) in order for Power to complete additional laps. Power was able to complete 66 laps to move up to 24th place. Hunter-Reay now had to finish in 5th place or better. Hunter-Reay gradually moved up through the field and into the top 5 to move into the championship lead. On lap 241, Kanaan crashed in turn 4 and the race was stopped. On the restart, Hunter-Reay managed to stay in the top 5. As the leaders started lap 250 (the final lap), Hunter-Reay was in turn 4 in 5th place when 4th place Takuma Sato spun and crashed. Hunter-Reay was able to avoid Sato just as Ed Carpenter passed Dario Franchitti for the lead. Carpenter would win the race while Hunter-Reay finished 4th and won both the overall and the oval championships. Hunter-Reay became the first American to win the series championship since Sam Hornish Jr. in 2006. Hunter-Reay would score 468 points to win the overall championship and 168 points to win the oval championship. Hunter-Reay also finished 2nd in the Mario Andretti Road Course Championship with 300 points compared to Power's 379. During the weekend of the championship Fontana race, Hunter-Reay was offered to drive a car at Team Penske in 2013. Hunter-Reay re-signed with Andretti for the 2013 and 2014 seasons. On December 5, Hunter-Reay announced that he would use car number 1 in 2013. Hunter-Reay's usual number (28) would appear inside of the 1.

For 2013 Hunter-Reay returned with Andretti Autosport to drive the #1 DHL/Sun Drop Dallara DW12-Ilmor-Chevrolet Indy V6 with additional sponsorship from Circle K, Dr. Pepper and Pelotonia. At the season-opening Honda Grand Prix of St. Petersburg on the Streets of St. Petersburg Hunter-Reay started 8th and retired after 79 laps due to throttle issues to finish 18th. At the second race of the season, the Honda Indy Grand Prix of Alabama at Barber Motorsports Park Hunter-Reay qualified on the pole position and led for 53 of 90 laps to win the race. At the next race, the Toyota Grand Prix of Long Beach on the Streets of Long Beach, Hunter-Reay finished 24th due to a crash after starting 2nd. Hunter-Reay qualified on the pole position at the São Paulo Indy 300 on the Streets of São Paulo. In the race Hunter-Reay led for 16 laps and finished 11th. Following the first four races of the season Hunter-Reay was ranked 6th in points. At the Indianapolis 500 Hunter-Reay qualified in 7th place. During the Firestone Fast Nine qualifying session (the qualifying session for the race that determines the pole sitter) Hunter-Reay's teammates Carlos Muñoz (2nd), Marco Andretti (3rd), E. J. Viso (4th) and James Hinchcliffe (9th) also qualified for the session. In the race Hunter-Reay battled with Andretti, Tony Kanaan and Ed Carpenter for the lead. On lap 193 Hunter-Reay took the lead and maintained it while the race was under caution for a crash by Graham Rahal. On a restart on lap 198 Kanaan took the lead going into turn 1 and teammate Muñoz also passed Hunter-Reay. Moments later Dario Franchitti lost control of his car in the same turn and hit the wall. The race finished under caution with Hunter-Reay finishing 3rd behind Kanaan and Muñoz. Hunter-Reay led 26 laps in the race. At the following races, the Detroit Belle Isle Grand Prix at Belle Isle State Park Hunter-Reay started 4th in each race and finished 2nd in race #1 and in race #2 Hunter-Reay finished 18th due to having to make repairs to his damaged car following a crash. Hunter-Reay's would either win or finish 2nd at the next three races. At the Firestone 550 at Texas Motor Speedway Hunter-Reay started 3rd and finished 2nd after leading for 35 laps. At the Milwaukee IndyFest at the Milwaukee Mile Hunter-Reay started 4th and won the race after leading for 65 laps in a race promoted by Hunter-Reay's car owner Michael Andretti. At the Iowa Corn Indy 250 at Iowa Speedway, Hunter-Reay started 12th and finished 2nd to teammate James Hinchcliffe. At the Pocono IndyCar 400 fueled by Sunoco at Pocono Raceway Hunter-Reay started 2nd on a front row sweep of Andretti cars with Marco Andretti on the pole position and Hinchcliffe in 3rd. On lap 63 Hunter-Reay was entering the pit lane when Takuma Sato was attempting to slow down and locked up his brakes. Sato would then rear-end Hunter-Reay's car and would take himself out of the race. Hunter-Reay's team was able to repair the car. Hunter-Reay would complete 121 laps before being parked. Hunter-Reay's next best finishes of the season were a 5th at the Honda Indy 200 at Mid-Ohio at Mid-Ohio Sports Car Course, where Hunter-Reay qualified on the pole position and led for 30 laps, and the GoPro Indy Grand Prix of Sonoma at Sonoma Raceway where Hunter-Reay finished 6th after starting 4th. At the season-ending MAVTV 500 IndyCar World Championships at Auto Club Speedway Hunter-Reay started 11th and led for 45 laps. Hunter-Reay later had mechanical issues and as a result Hunter-Reay dropped eight laps down. Due to several retirements late in the race Hunter-Reay was able to finish in 9th place. During the majority of the season Hunter-Reay was either 2nd or 3rd in points. Following the Grand Prix of Baltimore on the Streets of Baltimore Hunter-Reay dropped to 5th in points. Two races later, following the Shell and Pennzoil Grand Prix of Houston Race #2 at Reliant Park Hunter-Reay dropped to 6th in points. Hunter-Reay would finish 7th in points with 469 points.

In 2014 Hunter-Reay returned with Andretti Autosport to drive the #28 DHL Dallara DW12-Honda Indy Turbo V6. At the season-opening Firestone Grand Prix of St. Petersburg on the Streets of St. Petersburg Hunter-Reay started 3rd and finished 2nd. At the following race, the Toyota Grand Prix of Long Beach on the Streets of Long Beach, Hunter-Reay qualified on the pole position. In the race Hunter-Reay led for a race-high 51 laps. On lap 56 Josef Newgarden, who had battled with Hunter-Reay and Hunter-Reay's teammate James Hinchcliffe for most of the race, came out of the pit lane in 6th place after losing the lead to Sebastián Saavedra, Scott Dixon, Marco Andretti, Justin Wilson and Tony Kanaan. Hunter-Reay and Hinchcliffe, in 7th and 8th, were with Newgarden when he exited the pit lane. Hunter-Reay then attempted to pass for the eventual lead (after Dixon and Wilson). When Hunter-Reay attempted this the three cars crashed. The crash would involve Hunter-Reay, Hinchcliffe, Newgarden, Hélio Castroneves, Jack Hawksworth, Kanaan and Takuma Sato. Hunter-Reay would finish 20th. Following the race Hunter-Reay was criticized by Hinchcliffe, who called it a "rookie move". Hunter-Reay then won the following race, the Honda Indy Grand Prix of Alabama at Barber Motorsports Park after starting 3rd and leading for a race-high 40 laps. Hunter-Reay then finished 2nd at the Grand Prix of Indianapolis at the Indianapolis Motor Speedway road course. At the 2014 Indianapolis 500 Hunter-Reay qualified a disappointing 19th; however, he would win the race by 0.0600 seconds over Castoneves, the second-closest finish in Indianapolis 500 history behind 1992. Following Indianapolis Hunter-Reay took the points lead from Will Power. Hunter-Reay would then struggle during the next three races. At the Chevrolet Detroit Belle Isle Grand Prix twin races at Belle Isle State Park Hunter-Reay started 21st in each race (out of 22 cars). In race #1 Hunter-Reay crashed into a tire wall on the 70th (final) lap of the race and finished in 16th place. In race #2 Hunter-Reay suffered an electrical problem on lap 61 of 70 and finished in 19th place. Following the second Detroit race Hunter-Reay dropped to 3rd in points behind Power and Castroneves. At the following race, the Firestone 600 at Texas Motor Speedway, Hunter-Reay started 12th and finished 19th due to an engine fire after 136 laps. At the Shell and Pennzoil Grand Prix of Houston twin races at NRG Park were more successful for Hunter-Reay than the previous twin races at Detroit. In race #1 Hunter-Reay started 8th and finished 7th. In race #2 Hunter-Reay started 21st (out of 23 cars) and finished 6th. At the Pocono IndyCar 500 at Pocono Raceway Hunter-Reay started 9th and had mechanical problems early in the race. Hunter-Reay's team was able to repair the issue and Hunter-Reay finished 18th, nineteen laps down. At the following race, the Iowa Corn Indy 300 at Iowa Speedway, Hunter-Reay started 13th and was running in the top 10. On lap 282 of 300 Juan Pablo Montoya and Carpenter made contact (Montoya retired from the race while Carpenter continued). During the caution Hunter-Reay, Carpenter, Newgarden and Graham Rahal all made pit stops for new tires. On the restart on 291 the group quickly moved up through the field. On lap 299 Hunter-Reay passed Kanaan, who had dominated the race up to that point, for the lead. Hunter-Reay would go on to win the race after leading for only 2 laps in what would be Hunter-Reay's first lead lap finish of the season since winning the Indianapolis 500. Newgarden finished 2nd, Carpenter finished 5th and Rahal finished 7th. At the following races, the Honda Indy Toronto twin races at Exhibition Place, Hunter-Reay started 3rd in race #1 and 4th in race #2. In race #1 Hunter-Reay was battling with Kanaan on lap 40 when the two made contact, causing Hunter-Reay to crash into the wall and finish in 21st place. In race #2 Hunter-Reay finished in 14th place on the lead (56th) lap after several teams, including Hunter-Reay's, had their strategies changed during the race due to rain being on certain parts of the track at certain times. At the following race of the season, the Honda Indy 200 at Mid-Ohio at Mid-Ohio Sports Car Course, Hunter-Reay started 5th and spun out on lap 37. Despite the spin Hunter-Reay finished in 10th place. completing all 90 laps of the race. At the following race, the Wisconsin 250 at the Milwaukee Mile, Hunter-Reay had a poor qualifying performance and would start in 19th place due to the set up of the car being different than in practice (during practice Hunter-Reay had the 3rd fastest lap speed in the first practice session and the 6th fastest lap speed in the second practice session). In the race Hunter-Reay moved up through the field. After completing 168 laps Hunter-Reay had to retire from the race due to a damaged suspension and would finish in 21st place. At the following race, the GoPro Indy Grand Prix of Sonoma at Sonoma Raceway Hunter-Reay started 10th after having the fastest lap speed in the first practice session and the 3rd fastest lap speed in the second session. In the race Hunter-Reay moved into 4th place after Hélio Castroneves, Ryan Briscoe, Sébastien Bourdais and James Hinchcliffe (all of whom had qualified ahead of Hunter-Reay) were involved in a crash in turn 1. Hunter-Reay would finish 2nd to Scott Dixon after Rahal had to make a late race pit stop for fuel from the lead while Mike Conway, who was passed by Dixon and later Hunter-Reay immediately after Rahal pulled into the pit lane, ran out of fuel on the final lap of the race in the final turn of the track. Following the Sonoma race Hunter-Reay is ranked 4th in the point standings with 534 points. Following the race Hunter-Reay became ineligible to win the championship due to points leader Power leading Hunter-Reay by 93 points (Power would get 10 points for failing to start the race while Hunter-Reay could get 100 points for winning the race, causing Power to win the championship by 3 points). At the season-ending MAVTV 500 IndyCar World Championships at Auto Club Speedway Hunter-Reay started 9th and led for 26 laps. On lap 175 Hunter-Reay spun while coming out of turn 4. Hunter-Reay was able to continue and would finish in 16th place. Hunter-Reay would finish 6th in the final point standings with 563 points.

2015–2021
Hunter-Reay struggled significantly following the 2014 season. Over a six-year window he only recorded five wins and no wins since winning in Sonoma in 2018, while Andretti Autosport as whole secured two Indianapolis 500 victories and younger drivers Alexander Rossi and Colton Herta emerged as the lead drivers for the team over the same span. On August 18, 2021, Hunter Reay announced he would be leaving Andretti Autosport and would be retiring from full time IndyCar competition, though he will to return for the Indianapolis 500 and other select events with a new team.

A1 Grand Prix
Hunter-Reay began to compete in A1 Grand Prix during the 2006–07 season. Hunter-Reay would represent the United States with Phil Giebler and Jonathan Summerton for A1 Team USA in a team entered by West Surrey Racing. Hunter-Reay would drive an A1 Team USA Lola B05/52-Zytek V8 (the series did not use numbers for the individual cars). Hunter-Reay was originally going to make his debut in the series at the A1 Grand Prix of Nations, Beijing, China on the Beijing International Streetcircuit. During practice for the race there was problems with a turn of the track that was 180 degrees. The track was eventually changed and Hunter-Reay never got to drive in the event. Hunter-Reay would make his debut at the sixth round of the season (the eleventh and twelfth races of the season), the A1 Grand Prix of Nations, New Zealand at Taupo Motorsport Park. In the sprint race Hunter-Reay started in 16th place and finished in 11th place. In the feature race the starting line up was determined by the results of the sprint race. As a result, Hunter-Reay started in 11th place and would finish in 10th place. Hunter-Reay would not compete in any other A1 Grand Prix races during the season. The A1 Grand Prix team would finish in 9th place in the point standings with 42 points.

Sports car racing

American Le Mans Series
Hunter-Reay began to compete in the American Le Mans Series in 2002 at the Mobil 1 12 Hours of Sebring for JMB Racing in the #31 Aprimatic/Giesse Group Ferrari 360 Modena-Ferrari 3.6 L V8 with Peter Argetsinger and Andrea Montermini in the GT class. The car started 6th in its class and finished 19th due to a mechanical failure after 28 laps. The car would finish in 52nd place overall. JMB Racing would finish 17th in the GT teams championship (Hunter-Reay was unranked in the drivers championship).

Hunter-Reay would return to the series in 2010. Hunter-Reay would drive for Level 5 Motorsports in the #95 US Bank Oreca FLM09-Chevrolet 6.2 L V8 with Scott Tucker and James Gue in the LMPC class. At the 12 Hours of Sebring the car started 10th overall and 2nd in its class. The car would complete 224 laps to finish in 32nd place, 6th in class. Tucker and Hunter-Reay were going to drive the car at the following race, the Tequila Patrón American Le Mans Series at Long Beach on the Streets of Long Beach. The car would fail to start the race. Level 5 Motorsports would go on to win the LMPC teams championship (Hunter-Reay was unranked in the drivers championship).

In 2011 Hunter-Reay returned with Level 5 Motorsports to drive the #055 Microsoft Office 2010/Microsoft Windows Azure/Alpina Watches Lola B11/40-HPD HR28TT 2.8 L Turbo V6 with Scott Tucker and Luis Díaz in the LMP2 class. At the season-opening 12 Hours of Sebring the car started 17th overall and 2nd in its class. The car completed 300 laps to win its class and finish 20th overall. Hunter-Reay finished 4th in the LMP2 drivers standings with 30 points while Level 5 Motorsports won the LMP2 teams championship with 130 points.

For 2012 Hunter-Reay drove at the Mobil 1 12 Hours of Sebring for Level 5 Motorsports in the #95 Siemens/Alpina Watches/Ohiya Casino Resort HPD ARX-03b-Honda HR28TT 2.8 L Turbo V6 with Scott Tucker and Luis Díaz in the P2 class. The car started in 18th place overall and in 3rd place in its class. The car retired after 85 laps and finished in 58th place overall and in 4th place in class. Hunter-Reay then competed in the season-ending Petit Le Mans for SRT Motorsports in the #91 Street & Racing Technology SRT Viper GTS-R-SRT 8.0 L V10 with Kuno Wittmer and Dominik Farnbacher in the GT class. The car started in 27th place overall and in 9th place in its class. The car completed 369 laps to finish in 20th place overall and in 8th place in its class. Hunter-Reay was unranked in the P2 driver's standings and finished 27th in the GT drivers standings with 7 points. SRT Motorsports finished 8th in the GT teams standings with 12 points and Level 5 Motorsports won the P2 teams championship with 203 points.

In 2013 Hunter-Reay drove for Level 5 Motorsports at the Mobil 1 12 Hours of Sebring in the #552 Siemens/Alpina Watches/Ohiya Casino Resort HPD ARX-03b-Honda HR28TT 2.8 L Turbo V6 with Scott Tucker and Simon Pagenaud. The car started in 8th place overall and in 2nd place in its class. The car completed 345 laps to finish in 7th place overall and in 2nd place in its class. Hunter-Reay finished 10th in the P2 drivers standings and Level 5 Motorsports won the P2 teams championship with 199 points.

Rolex Grand-Am Sports Car Series

Hunter-Reay began to compete in the Rolex Grand-Am Sports Car Series in 2006 for SAMAX/Doncaster Racing in the #17 SAMAX/Doncaster Racing Porsche GT3 Cup in the GT class in three races. At both the U.S Sportscar Invitational at Mazda Raceway Laguna Seca and The GAINSCO Grand Prix at Phoenix International Raceway Hunter-Reay's co-driver was Ian James and the Rolex GT Series Challenge at Lime Rock Park with Mark Greenburg. At Laguna Seca the car started in 32nd place overall and in 4th place in class. The car completed 86 laps to finish in 23rd place overall and in 3rd place in its class. At Phoenix the car started in 26th place overall and in 3rd place in its class. The car retired after 91 laps to finish in 33rd place overall 12th place in its class. At Lime Rock the field consisted only of GT cars and Hunter-Reay started in 18th place and retired after 11 laps and finished in 18th place. Hunter-Reay then competed in the season-ending Discount Tire Sunchaser 1000K at Miller Motorsports Park for SunTrust Racing in the #10 SunTrust Banks Riley-Pontiac with Wayne Taylor and Max Angelelli in the DP class. The car started in 5th place both overall and in its class. The car completed 186 laps to finish in 14th place both overall and in its class. Hunter-Reay also finished 27th in the GT drivers standings with 107 points while the #17 SAMAX/Doncaster Racing entry finished 4th in the GT teams championship with 392 points. Hunter-Reay finished 97th in the DP driver's standings with 17 points while the #10 SunTrust Racing entry finished 3rd in the DP teams standings with 431 points.

In 2007 Hunter-Reay began to drive the #91 Riley MkXI-Pontiac 5.0L V8 for Riley-Matthews Motorsports in the DP class. At the season-opening Rolex 24 at Daytona Hunter-Reay co-drove with Jim Matthews, Marc Goossens and Jimmie Johnson. The car was sponsored at the race by Lowe's (who was the sponsor of Johnson's #48 Hendrick Motorsports Chevrolet Monte Carlo SS in the NASCAR Nextel Cup Series). The car started in 3rd place both overall and in class. The car completed 560 laps due to an engine failure. The car finished in 36th place overall and in 19th place in class. Hunter-Reay drove the car in three other races, all without sponsorship. At the Sahlen's Six Hours of the Glen at Watkins Glen International Hunter-Reay co-drove with Matthews and Goossens. The car started in 15th place both overall and in its class. The car completed 167 laps to finish in 6th place both overall and in its class. At the Emco Gears Classic at Mid-Ohio Sports Car Course Hunter-Reay drove with the same drivers to start in 17th place (the race only had DP class cars). The car completed 125 laps to finish in 11th place. Hunter-Reay returned to the series at the season-ending Discount Tire Sunchaser 1000 at Miller Motorsports Park Hunter-Reay drove with the same drivers to start in 19th place both overall and in its class. The car led for 20 laps and completed 139 laps to win the race both overall and in its class. Hunter-Reay finished 36th in the DP drivers standings with 92 points. The #91 Riley-Matthews Motorsports entry would finish 9th in the DP teams championship with 298 points.

For 2008 Riley-Matthews Motorsports and GAINSCO/Bob Stallings Racing ran the #91 Riley MkXI-Pontiac 5.0L V8 without sponsorship. At the season-opening Rolex 24 at Daytona Hunter-Reay co-drove with Jim Matthews, Johnny O'Connell and Marc Goossens in the DP class. The car started in 3rd place both overall and in its class. The car completed 676 laps to finish in 8th place both overall and in its class. Hunter-Reay returned to the car for the season-ending SunRichGourmet.com 1000 at Miller Motorsports Park as a co-driver to Matthews and Goossens. The car started in 13th place both overall and in its class. The car would finish in 7th place both overall and in its class. Hunter-Reay finished 34th in the DP drivers standings with 47 points. The #91 Riley-Matthews Motorsports and GAINSCO/Bob Stallings Racing entry finished 10th in the DP teams championship with 303 points.

In 2009 Hunter-Reay first drove for Michael Shank Racing in the #60 Westfield Insurance Riley Mk. XX-Ford 5.0L V8 at the season-opening Rolex 24 at Daytona in the DP class with Mark Patterson, Oswaldo Negri Jr. and Colin Braun. The car started in 10th place both overall and in its class. The car completed 262 laps before having electrical problems. The car would retire to finish in 41st place overall and in 16th place in class. Hunter-Reay returned to the series for the season-ending GAINSCO Grand Prix of Miami at Homestead-Miami Speedway in the #95 Edata Solutions/Ecomm Link Riley Mk. XX-BMW 5.0L V8 with Scott Tucker and Christophe Bouchut for Supercar Life Racing and Level 5 Motorsports. The car started in 5th place both overall and in its class and finished in 10th place both overall and in its class after completing all 100 laps. The trio of drivers also dove in a second car for Supercar Life Racing and Level 5 Motorsports, the #55 Edata Solutions/Ecomm Link Riley Mk. XX-BMW 5.0L V8. The car started in 12th place both overall and in its class. The car finished in 6th place both overall and in its class. Hunter-Reay's results in the #55 car were not counted towards the championship. Hunter-Reay finished 34th in the DP drivers championship with 36 points. The #60 Michael Shank Racing entry finished 9th in the DP teams championship with 270 points. The #55 Supercar Life Racing and Level 5 Motorsports entry finished 13th in the DP teams championship with 195 points. The #95 Supercar Life Racing and Level 5 Motorsports entry finished 22nd in the DP teams championship with 22 points.

In 2010 Hunter-Reay drove for Level 5 Motorsports in the #95 Crown Royal Cask No. 16 Riley Mk. XI-BMW 5.0L V8 in the DP class. At the season-ending Rolex 24 at Daytona Hunter-Reay co-drove with Christophe Bouchut, Lucas Luhr, Scott Tucker and Richard Westbrook. The car started in 13th place both overall and in its class. The car would lead for 11 laps and would finish in 3rd place both overall and in its class with 751 laps. Hunter-Reay then drove at the second race of the season, the Grand Prix of Miami at Homestead-Miami Speedway, in the same car, with additional sponsorship from US Bank, Spirit Jets, Drive Digital Medi and Supercar Life. Hunter-Reay would co-drive with Tucker. The car started in 6th place both overall and in its class. The car completed 120 laps to finish in 19th place overall and in 14th place in its class. Hunter-Reay would finish 23rd in the DP drivers championship with 47 points. The #95 Level 5 Motorsports entry would finish 14th in the DP teams championship with 47 points.

For 2011 Hunter-Reay only competed in the Rolex 24 of Daytona for Level 5 Motorsports in the #95 Microsoft/E-Data Solutions/Selling Source/US Bank Riley Mk XXII-BMW 5.0L V8 in the DP class with Scott Tucker, Richard Westbrook and Raphael Matos. The car started in 17th place both overall and in its class. The car would complete 703 laps to finish in 11th place both overall and in its class. Hunter-Reay finished 33rd in the DP drivers championship with 20 points. The #95 Level 5 Motorsports entry finished 20th in the DP teams championship with 20 points.

In 2012 Hunter-Reay only competed in the Rolex 24 at Daytona for Starworks Motorsport in the DP class in the #2 Motorola Riley Mk. XX-Ford 5.0L V8 with Marco Andretti, Scott Mayer and Michael Valiante. The car started in 9th place both overall and in its class. The car completed 736 laps to finish in 10th place both overall and in its class. Hunter-Reay would finish 36th in the DP drivers championship with 10 points. The #2 Starworks Motorsport entry finished 9th in the DP teams championship with 333 points.

In 2013 Hunter-Reay only competed in the Rolex 24 of Daytona for VelocityWW in the DP class in the #10 Velocity Worldwide Dallara Corvette DP-Chevrolet 5.0L V8 with Max Angelelli and Jordan Taylor. The car started in 12th place both overall and in its class. The car led for 56 laps and completed 709 laps to finish in 2nd place both overall and in its class. Hunter-Reay finished 33rd in the DP drivers championship. The #10 VelocityWW entry finished 2nd in the DP teams championship with 339 points.

IMSA Tudor United SportsCar Championship
Hunter-Reay began to compete in the IMSA Tudor United SportsCar Championship after the American Le Mans Series and the Rolex Grand-Am Sports Car Series merged in 2013. Hunter-Reay would drive for SRT Motorsports in the #91 Street and Racing Technology SRT Viper GTS-R-SRT 8.0 L V10 in the GTLM class. At the season-opening Rolex 24 at Daytona Hunter-Reay co-drove with Dominik Farnbacher and Marc Goossens. The car would qualify on the pole position in its class and in 24th place overall. The car would complete 675 laps to finish in 3rd place in its class and in 12th place in its class. Hunter-Reay then competed in the second race of the season, the 12 Hours of Sebring. Hunter-Reay drove the same car with the same co-drivers from Daytona. The car started in 10th place in its class and in 35th place overall. The car would complete 284 laps to finish in 7th place in its class and in 18th place overall. Hunter-Reay would compete in the season-ending Petit Le Mans in the same car with Kuno Wittmer and Goosens. The car would start in 26th place and would finish in 11th place overall with 392 laps complete. The car would finish in 3rd place in its class. Hunter-Reay would finish in 19th place in the GTLM drivers championship with 87 points. The #91 SRT Motorsports entry would finish in 3rd place in the GTLM teams championship with 314 points.

Race of Champions

Hunter-Reay was invited to compete in the Race of Champions in 2012. Hunter-Reay was the only driver to compete to represent the IndyCar Series and would be the first driver since Bertrand Baguette in 2010 to represent the series. Hunter-Reay was part of the Americas team with Mexican driver Benito Guerra Jr. In the Group A races of the Nations Cup Hunter-Reay would have 1 win and 2 losses while Guerra would have 2 wins and 1 loss. The team's first race was against the All-Stars team. In Hunter-Reay's first race he raced against Tom Kristensen and the two each raced in Volkswagen Sciroccos. Kristensen would win the race with a time of 1 minute and 23.0759 seconds compared to Hunter-Reay's time of 1 minute and 24.5635 seconds. Guerra would win in his race against Jorge Lorenzo. The team's next race came against the Great Britain team. Hunter-Reay would compete against David Coulthard and the two each raced in KTM X-Bows. Hunter-Reay would win the race with a time of 1 minute and 19.1336 seconds compared to Coulthard's time of 1 minute and 16.2360 seconds, which had 5 seconds added to it due Coulthard making a false start. Guerra lost in his race against Andy Priaulx. The team's third and final race in Group A was against the France team. Hunter-Reay would race against Romain Grosjean and the two each raced in Audi R8 LMSes. Grosjean would beat Hunter-Reay in the race with a time of 1 minute and 16.5117 seconds compared to Hunter-Reay's time of 1 minute and 18.5096 seconds, which had 5 seconds added to it due to Hunter-Reay making a false start. Guerra would win in his race against Sébastien Ogier. The team would finish in 3rd place in the Group A results behind the France and All-Stars teams. The team would fail to qualify for the semifinals. In the Race of Champions races Hunter-Reay would compete in Group D. In Hunter-Reay's first race he competed against Kazuya Oshima and the two each raced in KTM X-Bows. In the race Hunter-Reay won with a time of 1 minute and 17.0206 seconds compared to Oshima's time of 1 minute and 22.5314 seconds, which had 5 seconds added to it due to Oshima making a false start. In Hunter-Reay's second race he competed against Grosjean and each raced in ROC Cars. In the race Grosjean won with a time of 1 minute and 19.3890 seconds compared to Hunter-Reay's time of 1 minute and 26.2154 seconds, which 5 seconds added to it due to Hunter-Reay making a false start. In Hunter-Reay's final race in Group D he competed against Michael Schumacher and each raced in Euro Racecars. In the race Schumacher won the race with a time of 1 minute and 17.8680 seconds compared to Hunter-Reay's time of 1 minute and 25.2427 seconds, which had 5 seconds added to it due to Hunter-Reay making a false start. Hunter-Reay would finish in 3rd place in the Group D standings with 1 win and 2 losses, finishing behind Schumacher and Grosjean. Hunter-Reay would fail to qualify for the quarterfinals.

Hunter-Reay would return to the races in 2014 and would be the only representative of the Verizon IndyCar Series. In the team events Kurt Busch would be Hunter-Reay's teammate. Busch had been Hunter-Reay's teammate at Andretti Autosport for the 2014 2014 Indianapolis 500.

Personal life

Marriage
Hunter-Reay is married to ex-Champ Car World Series pit reporter, and off-road racing driver, Beccy Gordon, sister of former Champ Car World Series, NASCAR Sprint Cup Series and Verizon IndyCar Series driver and car owner Robby Gordon. Their son Ryden was born on December 28, 2012. They welcomed a second son Rocsen Indy Hunter-Reay in March 2015. Ryan and Beccy welcomed their third son Rhodes on September 14, 2016.

Number 28
Since the 2011 season Hunter-Reay's car number has been 28. The number 28 is meant to represent the estimated 28 million people that live with cancer. In 2009 Hunter-Reay's mother died of colon cancer. During the 2013 season Hunter-Reay, as the defending series champion, used number 1 as his car number. This would be the first time that a defending champion has used #1 in the Verizon IndyCar Series since Scott Dixon in 2004 (although Michael Andretti did use #1 in a one-off race during the 2006 season at the Indianapolis 500 due to the team winning the championship the previous season with Dan Wheldon). During the 2013 season a small 28 was placed inside of the 1.

Other
Hunter-Reay currently resides in Fort Lauderdale, Florida. He fishes in his spare time, stating "it's a great escape from anything". He owns a Yellowfin Yachts 42-foot yacht named Inside Line which he uses on his fishing trips.

Media appearances

Television and film

Hunter-Reay was featured on the NBC Sports Network television series IndyCar 36. The episode was about Hunter-Reay's race weekend at the 2012 Toyota Grand Prix of Long Beach on the Streets of Long Beach. The episode was broadcast prior to the 2012 São Paulo Indy 300 on the Streets of São Paulo, where Hunter-Reay finished in 2nd place to Will Power, on April 29, 2012.

After Hunter-Reay won the 2012 championship a documentary was filmed, titled Ryan Hunter-Reay: An American Champion, that showed Hunter-Reay, his wife Beccy, and newborn son Ryden in the months after Hunter-Reay won the 2012 series championship. The film was broadcast on the NBC Sports Network.

Motorsports career results

American open–wheel racing results

Barber Dodge Pro Series
(key) (Races in bold indicate pole position)

Atlantic Championship
(key) (Races in bold indicate pole position)

Champ Car World Series
(key) (Races in bold indicate pole position)

 ^ New points system implemented in 2004.

IndyCar Series
(key) (Races in bold indicate pole position)

* Season still in progress.
 1 The Las Vegas Indy 300 was abandoned after Dan Wheldon died from injuries sustained in a 15-car crash on lap 11.

Indianapolis 500

IMSA SportsCar Championship

Superstar Racing Experience
(key) * – Most laps led. 1 – Heat 1 winner. 2 – Heat 2 winner.

References

External links

IndyCar Driver Page
IndyCar 11 in '11 video
IndyCar 36: Ryan Hunter-Reay – IndyCar documentary

1980 births
Living people
Champ Car drivers
A1 Team USA drivers
IndyCar Series champions
IndyCar Series drivers
Indianapolis 500 drivers
Indianapolis 500 Rookies of the Year
Atlantic Championship drivers
24 Hours of Daytona drivers
American Le Mans Series drivers
Rolex Sports Car Series drivers
Racing drivers from Dallas
Sportspeople from Fort Lauderdale, Florida
Barber Pro Series drivers
WeatherTech SportsCar Championship drivers
Indianapolis 500 winners
12 Hours of Sebring drivers
American Spirit Team Johansson drivers
Rocketsports Racing drivers
Rahal Letterman Lanigan Racing drivers
Vision Racing drivers
A. J. Foyt Enterprises drivers
Andretti Autosport drivers
Multimatic Motorsports drivers
Team Joest drivers
HVM Racing drivers
Wayne Taylor Racing drivers
Level 5 Motorsports drivers
Starworks Motorsport drivers
Meyer Shank Racing drivers
Chip Ganassi Racing drivers